Alder (formerly known as I-880/Milpitas) is a light rail station operated by Santa Clara Valley Transportation Authority (VTA).  This station is served by the Orange Line of the VTA Light Rail system.

The station was opened on May 17, 2001, as part of VTA's Tasman East light rail extension.

The station has a 275 space park and ride lot situated diagonally opposite from the platform. The entrance to the parking lot has a large public art installation, a clocktower called "Gateway to the City of Milpitas."

History 

Alder originally served as the eastern terminus of the first phase of the Tasman East light rail extension on May 17, 2001, and so was originally served by trains operating directly from Mountain View.

When the station first opened, it served the southern terminus of AC Transit's 217 bus, the only such service that runs into Santa Clara County. Since then, the second phase of the Tasman East extension altered the station's service patterns, and the 217 bus now terminates at the Milpitas Transit Center.

Since 2017, VTA's plans for new routes in support of the Silicon Valley BART extension included renaming this station "Alder" after its cross-street Alder Drive. The name change was made on December 28, 2019.

Service

Location 
Alder station is located in the median of Tasman Drive just west of Alder Drive near Interstate 880 in Milpitas, California.

Station layout

References

External links 
Alder station – VTA

Santa Clara Valley Transportation Authority light rail stations
Santa Clara Valley Transportation Authority bus stations
Buildings and structures in Milpitas, California
Railway stations in the United States opened in 2001
2001 establishments in California